The Western Province women's cricket team is the women's representative cricket team for part of the South African province of Western Cape, primarily based in Cape Town. They compete in the Women's Provincial Programme and the CSA Women's Provincial T20 Competition, and they are the most successful side in both competitions, with 8 and 7 title wins, respectively.

History
Western Province Women first competed in the Simon Trophy between 1951–52 and 1975–76, winning the title a recorded three times. They joined the Inter-Provincial One-Day Tournament for its inaugural season in 1995–96, and have competed in every season since. They finished as runners-up to England Under-21s in 1997–98. The side won its first title in 2005–06, beating Boland in the final, before retaining their title the following season against the same opposition. They next won the tournament in 2008–09, before emerging victorious four years in a row between 2012–13 and 2015–16. They won their eighth title in 2017–18, before finishing as runners-up to North West in the following two seasons. In the 2020–21 season, due to COVID-19 protocols, there was no overall winner, but the side did win one of the two top tier groups, going unbeaten.

Western Province Women have also competed in the CSA Women's Provincial T20 Competition since its inception in 2012–13, and won the inaugural tournament. They went on to win the tournament four times in a row between 2014–15 and 2017–18, and then won their sixth and seventh titles in 2019–20 and 2021–22.

Players

Current squad
Based on squad announced for the 2021–22 season. Players in bold have international caps.

Notable players
Players who have played for Western Province and played internationally are listed below, in order of first international appearance (given in brackets):

  Sheelagh Nefdt (1960)
  Beverly Lang (1960)
  Maureen Payne (1960)
  Wea Skog (1972)
  Juanita van Zyl (1972)
  Denise Weyers (1972)
  Helen Davies (1997)
  Ally Kuylaars (1997)
  Kim Price (1997)
  Denise Reid (1997)
  Belinda Dermota (1997)
  Levona Lewis (1999)
  Sune van Zyl (1999)
  Alison Hodgkinson (2000)
  Cri-Zelda Brits (2002)
  Claire Cowan (2003)
  Leighshe Jacobs (2003)
  Shandre Fritz (2003)
  Ashlyn Kilowan (2003)
  Shabnim Ismail (2007)
  Olivia Anderson (2008)
  Yolandi van der Westhuizen (2009)
  Moseline Daniels (2010)
  Yolandi Potgieter (2013)
  Alexis le Breton (2013)
  Nadine Moodley (2013)
  Bernadine Bezuidenhout (2014)
  Andrie Steyn (2014)
  Yolani Fourie (2014)
  Lara Goodall (2016)
  Laura Wolvaardt (2016)
  Sinalo Jafta (2016)
  Nadine de Klerk (2017)
  Stacy Lackay (2018)
  Yasmeen Khan (2018)
  Babette de Leede (2018)
  Saarah Smith (2018)
  Faye Tunnicliffe (2018)
  Delmi Tucker (2022)

Honours
 CSA Women's Provincial Programme:
 Winners (8): 2005–06, 2006–07, 2008–09, 2012–13, 2013–14, 2014–15, 2015–16 & 2017–18
 CSA Women's Provincial T20 Competition:
 Winners (7): 2012–13, 2014–15, 2015–16, 2016–17, 2017–18, 2019–20 & 2021–22

See also
 Western Province (cricket team)

Notes

References

Women's cricket teams in South Africa
Cricket in the Western Cape